Workers' or Workers Playtime may refer to:

Workers' Playtime (radio programme), a BBC radio programme (1941–64)
Workers Playtime (album), a music album by Billy Bragg (1988)